Quintus Fulvius Flaccus may refer to:
 Quintus Fulvius Flaccus (consul 237 BC)
 Quintus Fulvius Flaccus (consul 180 BC)
 Quintus Fulvius Flaccus (consul 179 BC)